The Juno Award for Alternative Album of the Year is presented annually at Canada's Juno Awards to honour the best album of the year in the alternative rock and/or indie rock genres. The award was first presented in 1995 under the name Best Alternative Album, and adopted its current name in 2003.

Achievements
Arcade Fire and July Talk have won the award three times to date, while Broken Social Scene and Rufus Wainwright have won the award twice each. In addition to Broken Social Scene's wins as a band, three members have also won the award for separate projects — Emily Haines and James Shaw have also won the award twice with their band Metric, and Leslie Feist has won for a solo album. Arcade Fire have been nominated for the award four times overall, while Broken Social Scene, Metric, Stars, Chad VanGaalen,  Tegan and Sara and July Talk have received three nominations each.

Only two French-language albums have ever been nominated (Malajube's Trompe-l'œil and Karkwa's Les Chemins de verre) and none has ever won.

Recipients

Best Alternative Album (1995–2002)

Alternative Album of the Year (2003–present)

References 

Alternative Album
Album awards